Ramanputhoor is a town in Kanyakumari, a district of the Indian state of Tamil Nadu.

Educational institutions 
There are many schools in the area, such as Carmel Higher Secondary School and the Little Flower Girls Higher Secondary School. There is a famous Catholic church, Holy Family Church, which is the second largest parish in the Roman Catholic diocese of Kottar and the third-largest in revenue.

History 
The majority of Ramanputhoor residents are Catholic. Elders of the area believe that this Hindu place was converted to Christianity when St.Francis Xavier visited Ramanputhoor in the 16th century.

Economy
Ramanputhoor is well known for construction workers, who used to gather here in the morning before proceeding with the day's work. 
Other important buildings include Rita's Convent, an institution run by nuns where working women are provided boarding. There are several nursing homes in the area, the result of several locals who studied medicine from the 1970s onwards. Kalveedu, built of stones and concrete, is the first house built in this area.

Notable Personality
Well-known personalities of Ramanputhoor include  Ln.Er. I. Nicholas, the Chief Engineer/Humanitarian who designed & developed Machines such as NICHO Vegetable Seed Extractor (1968-1970), NICHO Fuzzy Seed Cleaning Machine (1981-82),NICHO Groundnut Blower Grader (1983), NICHO GroundGroundnut Cleaner cum Grader (Nov 1984- March 1984)     

Dr. Mariya Johnson Thirupapu, who received the first Grand Award for native doctor from the President of India; Dr. Dorothy, a paediatrician at Brooklyn Hospital in New York City; Mervin Alexander, the Postmaster General of Chennai; Dr. Henry Louis, an agricultural scientist credited with co-creating the hybrid variety of coconut palm

See also 
 Mela Raman Puthoor 
 Kela Raman Puthoor

References 

 Holy Family Church, Ramanputhoor
 Devi Mutharaman Thirukovil

Cities and towns in Kanyakumari district